School District 49 Central Coast is a school district in British Columbia. It covers the remote areas of coastal British Columbia north of Vancouver Island and south of Prince Rupert This includes the communities of Bella Coola, Hagensborg, Denny Island and Oweekeno (Rivers Inlet).

Schools

See also
List of school districts in British Columbia

49